WVCB (1410 AM) is a silent radio station formerly broadcasting a combination of contemporary Christian and gospel music. WVCB transmits with a daytime power of 500 watts, reducing to 168 watts during nighttime. It has always held the callsign WVCB. WVCB was an affiliate of the Carolina Panthers Radio Network. It also aired Music & the Spoken Word from CBS Radio. WVCB went silent on September 15, 2021.

History

Shallotte Broadcasting Company
The Shallotte Broadcasting Company applied for a new broadcasting license on April 30, 1962, which was granted on September 11, 1963. On October 3, 1963, the callsign WVCB was attached to the construction permit. WVCB began broadcasting on June 11, 1964. Its license was granted on January 12, 1965.

The John Worrell years
In January 1984, John Worrell bought the station. Upon his death, ownership transferred to his wife, Joyce.
On December 24, 2014, the station went off the air; it returned to the air on December 6, 2015.

Post-John Worrell
WVCB changed its format in April 2017 to a more contemporary and gospel music format, adding national and local ministries as broadcast partners. WVCB also began streaming its broadcast on TUNEIN and the website. WVCB went silent on September 15, 2021 due to its transmitter failing. Station ownership was contemplating the future of the station.

References

External links

VCB